

History
DataFlow Group was founded in 2006 with its headquarters located in Dubai. The company has a network of 100,000 issuing authorities throughout more than 200 countries, in addition to 620 experts and researchers. Applicants that require PSV sto support equalisation applications from several governmental or quasi-governmental entities in the UAE and the GCC are effectively forced to use this service as their PSV format is the only acceptable format for submission.  For example:  "The Ministry of Education UAE has partnered with Dataflow to provide a fast track verification service for individuals applying for the equivalency of their degrees obtained outside of UAE". Despite the claimed benefits of such a partnership, numerous complaints from applicants are easily accessible online citing lack of customer support, poor communication, lack of timely response to applications.

Through its worldwide locations, DataFlow Group serves a client database spanning 200 countries. Among the company's clients are government, quasi-government, regulatory and multinational organizations across the globe.

In 2014, EQT Mid Market - a leading private equity group in Northern Europe, with portfolio companies in Northern and Eastern Europe, Asia and US - acquired DataFlow Group in order to expand the company's services.

Services
DataFlow Group accepts payments with the promise to offer background check and document verification solutions for public and private sector organizations in adherence with Joint Commission International (JCI) guidelines and Service Organization Controls (SOC) compliance standards. The company also provides proprietary databases and international watch lists for organizations to use in their own screening processes.

See also
 Background check
 Data verification

References

Business services companies established in 2006
Companies based in Dubai
Service companies of the United Arab Emirates
Emirati companies established in 2006